The Truth is Spice 1's 11th studio album, released on October 4, 2005.

Track listing
 "Intro"
 "No Real G'z"
 "Thug Music"
 "Heartbreak Hotel"
 "Everybody Wanna Go to Heaven"
 "Dear Haters"
 "Leave the Ridin' to Us" (Performed by Thug Lordz)
 "Keep Ballin'"
 "This Is Bizness"
 "Money Thang" (feat. Kurupt & Jayo Felony)
 "Pop That"
 "How We Boss Up"
 "Get High"
 "What You Workin' Wit'?"
 "Outro"

2005 albums
Spice 1 albums